The Levant Company, an English chartered company formed in 1581, employed chaplains in some cities of the Eastern Mediterranean.

Source: List of British Consular Officials in Turkey (1581-1860) (PDF).

Chaplains at Aleppo
1597-1600 ? Maye
1600–1608 William Biddulph
1624–1630 Charles Robson
1630–1635 Edward Pococke
1636 -? Thomas Pritchett
1641–1645 Bartholemew Chapple
1650-1654 Nathaniel Hill
1655–1670 Robert Frampton
1671–1681 Robert Huntington
1681-1687 John Guise
1688–1694 William Halifax
1695–1701 Henry Maundrell
1701-1703 Henry Brydges
1703-1706 Harrington Yarborough
1706–1716 Thomas Owen
1716–1719 Samuel Lisle
1719-? Joseph Soley
1729–1742 Edward Edwards
1743-1748 John Hemming
1750-1753 Thomas Crofts
1756-1758 Charles Holloway
1758–1769 Thomas Dawes
1769–1770 Eleazar Edwards
1770–1778 Robert Foster
1779 John Hussey
1783 Post abolished

Chaplains at Constantinople
c.1611–1614 William Ford
To 1618 Thomas King
1637–1640 Edward Pococke
1663–1664 Denham, probably Benjamin Denham
1664-1668 Henry Denton
1668–1670 Thomas Smith
1670–1677 John Covel
c.1700 Jean Armand Dubourdieu
1718, 1725 and 1733-1736 Thomas Payne
c.1765–1775 Sidney Swinney
Charles Nicholson
1794 James Dallaway
1799 Philip Hunt
1802–1804 George Cecil Renouard
c.1816 Henry Lindsay
1817–1822 Jacob George Wrench
1820–c.1828 and 1831–c.1835 Robert Walsh

Chaplains at Smyrna
1635, arrived 1636 Thomas Curtis
1652 Eleazar Duncon
1653 Thomas Browne
To c.1654 Hales
1654, arrived 1655 Robert Winchester
1661 Clarke
1663–1664 John Broadgate
1664–1669 John Luke
1670–1673 Philip Traherne
1673–1683 John Luke again
1689–1693 Edward Smyth
1698–1702 Edmund Chishull
1702–1710 John Tisser
1710–1716 Samuel Lisle
1759 Philip Brown 
1789-1807 John Frederick Usko
1811–1814 George Cecil Renouard
1817–1820 Charles Williamson
1822–c.1836 Francis Vyvyan Jago Arundell
1840 onwards William Bucknor Lewis

Other
1720–1732 Thomas Shaw at Algiers

References 

Lists of Anglicans
Levant Company
Chaplains